or Mount North Tottabetsu is located in the Hidaka Mountains, Hokkaidō, Japan.

References
 Google Maps
 Geographical Survey Institute
 Hokkaipedia

Kitatottabetsu